SS El Faro was a United States-flagged, combination roll-on/roll-off and lift-on/lift-off cargo ship crewed by U.S. merchant mariners. Built in 1975 by Sun Shipbuilding & Drydock Co. as Puerto Rico, the vessel was renamed Northern Lights in 1991 and, finally, El Faro in 2006. She was lost at sea with her entire crew of 33 on October 1, 2015, after steaming into the eyewall of Hurricane Joaquin.

El Faro departed Jacksonville, Florida, under the command of Captain Michael Davidson, bound for San Juan, Puerto Rico, at 8:10 p.m. EST on September 29, 2015, when then-Tropical Storm Joaquin was several hundred miles to the east. Around 7:30 a.m. on October 1, the ship had taken on water and was listing 15 degrees. The last report from the captain, however, indicated that the crew had contained the flooding. Shortly after that, El Faro ceased all communications with shore.

On October 2, the 40-year-old ship was declared missing. An extensive search operation was launched by the United States Coast Guard, with help from the United States Navy, the United States Air Force, and the Air National Guard. Searchers recovered debris and a damaged lifeboat, and spotted (but could not recover) an unidentifiable body. El Faro was declared sunk on October 5. The search was called off at sunset on October 7, by which time more than  had been covered by aircraft and ships. The Navy sent  to conduct an underwater search for El Faro on October 19, 2015. Apache identified wreckage on October 31 "consistent with the [El Faro] cargo ship ... in an upright position and in one piece". The next day, November 1, the Navy announced a submersible had returned images that identified the wreck as El Faro.

Construction, modification and earlier career
El Faro was built by the Sun Shipbuilding and Drydock Corporation in Chester, Pennsylvania, in 1975 as Puerto Rico. As operated by the Navieras de Puerto Rico Steamship Company, Puerto Rico hauled cargo to and from the East Coast for fifteen years. In 1991, she was purchased by Saltchuk Resources, the parent company of TOTE Maritime, and renamed Northern Lights. Under Saltchuk, she frequently sailed between Tacoma, Washington, and Anchorage, Alaska.

In 1992, the ship underwent a conversion at Atlantic Marine Shipyard in Mobile, Alabama. A 90-foot (27 meters) mid-body, which included an additional cargo hold and a spar deck, was added. Between 2005 and 2006 the ship was modified a second time, also at Atlantic Marine Shipyard, to carry lift-on/lift-off cranes. An additional 4875 long tons (4953.2 metric tons) of fixed ballast was added, and the ship's load line was raised by about two feet so additional cargo could be carried. However, a required damage stability assessment was not performed.

In February 2003, just before the U.S.-led invasion of Iraq, the ship was chartered by the Military Sealift Command as part of Operation Iraqi Freedom; she ferried Marines and military equipment from San Diego, California, to Kuwait. On March 19, while in the Persian Gulf, the vessel came under fire from missiles. The nearby explosions rocked the ship but caused no damage or injuries.

Through October 2005, near the end of the ship's chartered service, she made 25 voyages and 49 port calls. Collectively, 12,200 pieces of military equipment—weighing  in all—were transported by the ship. Robert Magee, then president of TOTE, and the ship's crew were praised by United States Air Force general Norton A. Schwartz: "You and your team of professionals showcased the US flag industry at its best." After completing her military services in 2006, the ship was transferred by TOTE to its subsidiary company Sea Star Lines and renamed El Faro. The vessel returned to the original route and served as a "lifeline" between the U.S. mainland and Puerto Rico.

When she sank on October 1, 2015, El Faro was scheduled to return to Tacoma to relieve another vessel.

Vessel condition

El Faro had passed two inspections, one by the United States Coast Guard, in March and June 2014. She completed the American Bureau of Shipping class and statutory surveys in February 2015. The National Transportation Safety Board (NTSB) found that safety drills were conducted weekly and that the ship met stability criteria when she left Jacksonville, Florida, for her fateful voyage.

Former crew members of El Faro expressed surprise and shock that the vessel had set sail with a major storm along its planned track. They said the vessel was "a rust bucket" that was not "supposed to be on the water" and that it suffered drainage problems and leaks in the galley compartment. They reported that the ship's decks were filled with holes as recently as two months before her sinking.

Following the ship's disappearance, the Coast Guard's Marine Safety Center staff examined El Faros sister ship, El Yunque. The staff found that the condition of El Yunques cargo ventilation system was poor and likely would have been a source of intermittent flooding during rolling in 25–30 ft seas (7.6 - 9.1 meters).

Final voyage

On September 29, 2015, at 8:10 p.m., El Faro left Jacksonville for San Juan, Puerto Rico, carrying a cargo of 391 shipping containers, about 294 trailers and cars, and a crew of 33 people—28 Americans and 5 Poles. The decision to depart Jacksonville by the captain, Michael Davidson, was reasonable given the options available to avoid Hurricane Joaquin; however, he subsequently failed to take sufficient action to avoid the hurricane.

Vessel route

Upon departure, Captain Davidson planned on using El Faros normal, direct route to San Juan, which he expected would pass south of Hurricane Joaquin; however, tropical storm and hurricane wind fields were forecast to be near the vessel’s normal route.

At the time, Hurricane Joaquin was still a tropical storm, but meteorologists at the National Hurricane Center forecast that it would likely become a hurricane by the morning of October 1, on a southwest trajectory toward the Bahamas.

On September 30 at 6:40 a.m. after a review of updated weather data, Davidson and his chief mate decided to alter course slightly southward. Later, at 11:05 p.m., the third mate called Davidson and told him that maximum winds from Joaquin had increased to 100 mph and that the storm was moving toward El Faros planned track-line. A few minutes later, at 11:13 p.m., the third mate called a second time and suggested a diversion to the south. The second mate, Danielle Randolph, also called Davidson at about 1:20 am on October 1 and suggested a course change through Crooked Island Passage. Randolph voiced concern in an email to friends and family: "There is a hurricane out here and we are heading straight into it."

Hurricane Joaquin

Joaquin became a hurricane by 8:00 a.m. on September 30, then rapidly intensified. Throughout the rest of the day and into the morning of October 1, the storm continued to track southwest.

Ten hours after departing from Jacksonville, El Faro had deviated from her charted course. Less than twenty hours later, at around 7:30 a.m. on October 1, the Coast Guard received a satellite notification that the vessel had lost propulsion, taken on water—though flooding was contained at the time of the message—and had a 15-degree list. The Coast Guard also received a single ping from the ship's Emergency Position Indicating Radio Beacon. Subsequent attempts to open communications with El Faro were unsuccessful.

Voyage data recorder audio 
On December 13, 2016, the NTSB released a 500-page transcript of the conversations that occurred on the bridge in the ship's final twenty-six hours, as recorded by the vessel's voyage data recorder (VDR) and its six microphones.

The transcript described a quickly deteriorating situation. At 5:43 a.m. on the morning of the sinking, Davidson took a phone call indicating suspected flooding in the no. 3 cargo hold and sent the chief mate to investigate. The crew began taking measures to try to assess and control the flooding. Thirty minutes later, the ship lost its steam propulsion plant. At 6:54 a.m., Davidson took a phone call describing the situation on board:

 "It's miserable right now. We got all the uhh—all the wind on the starboard side here. Now a scuttle was left open or popped open or whatever so we got some flooding down in three hold—a significant amount. Umm, everybody's safe right now, we're not gonna abandon ship—we're gonna stay with the ship. We are in dire straits right now. Okay, I'm gonna call the office and tell 'em [unintelligible]. Okay? Umm there's no need to ring the general alarm yet—we're not abandoning ship. The engineers are trying to get the plant back. So we're working on it—okay?"

At 7:06 a.m., Davidson made a phone call, stating:

 "I have a marine emergency and I would like to speak with a QI (Qualified Individual). We had a hull breach- a scuttle blew open during the storm. We have water down in three hold. We have a heavy list. We've lost the main propulsion unit. The engineers cannot get it goin'. Can I speak with a QI please?"
 "We have uhh secured the source of water coming into the vessel. Uh, A scuttle was blown open ... it's since been closed. However, uh, three hold's got a considerable amount of water in it. Uh, we have a very, very healthy port list. The engineers cannot get lube oil pressure on the plant, therefore we've got no main engine, and let me give you, um, a latitude and longitude. I just wanted to give you a heads up before I push that- push that button."
 "The crew is safe. Right now we're trying to save the ship now, but, uh, all available hands. We are forty-eight miles east of San Salvador. We are taking every measure to take the list off. By that I mean pump out that- pump out that hold the best we can but we are not gaining ground at this time."
 "Right now it's a little hard to tell because all the wind is ... on that side too so we got a good wind heel goin'. But it's not getting any better."
 "[We're] gonna stay with the ship ... no one's panicking, everybody's been made aware ... Our safest bet is to stay with the ship during this particular time. The weather is ferocious out here and we're gonna stay with the ship ... swell is out the northeast, a solid ten to twelve feet (over) spray, high winds, very poor visibility ..."

At 7:10 a.m., Davidson told someone on the phone that the ship was caught in a 10- to 15-degree list, "but a lot of that's with the wind heel". He informed the person that he would be making a distress call to the Coast Guard, and then directed the second mate to activate El Faros Ship Security Alert System and Global Maritime Distress and Safety System. He then directed the rest of the crew to wake up.

At 7:15 a.m., the chief mate returned to the bridge:

 Chief mate: "I think that the water level's rising, Captain."
 Captain: "(okay). Do you know where it's comin' from?"
 Chief Mate: "(At) first the Chief said something hit the fire main. Got it ruptured. Hard."
 Captain: "Um, there's no way to secure that?"
 Chief Mate: "We don't know if they still have any pressure on the fire main or not. Don't know where's sea – between the sea suction and the hull or what, uh, but anything I say is a guess."
 
At 7:17 a.m., the chief engineer informed the chief mate and the captain over the sound-powered phone that the bilge alarm was going off in "two alpha". The captain asked the chief mate if he could pump out all of the cargo holds at the same time and discussed the worsening list. The chief mate replied that the cars were floating in the #3 cargo hold and that the fire main was below the surface of the water, so he could not see the damage or if water was still coming in. Two minutes later, after further discussion with the chief mate, the captain called the chief engineer and asked, "Can you ... isolate the fire main from down in the uh engine room? ... On the engine room side the isolation valve [on the] suction [for the] fire pump ... secure it, isolate it on your side so there's no free communication from the sea."

At 7:24 a.m., Davidson, with a crew member on the phone, said, "We still got reserve buoyancy and stability." He then instructed the second mate to ring the general alarm and wake up the crew. Davidson then gave the order to abandon ship, and about a minute later could be heard on the bridge calling out, "Bow is down, bow is down!" He then called over the UHF radio for the chief mate to "Get into your rafts! Throw all your rafts into the water! Everybody get off! Get off the ship! Stay together!".

For the next several minutes, Davidson tried to help a panicked helmsman get off the bridge, with alarms ringing all around. The captain repeatedly told the helmsman not to panic: "Work your way up here", "You're okay, come on", and "I'm not leavin' you, let's go!" The helmsman exclaimed, "I need a ladder! A line!" and "I need someone to help me!". The VDR recording ends at 7:39 a.m. with the captain and the helmsman still on the bridge.

Search operations

On October 1, WC-130J Super Hercules aircraft of the U.S. Air Force Reserve 53rd Weather Reconnaissance Squadron tried to locate El Faro without success. On October 2, a Coast Guard HC-130H Hercules aircraft from Coast Guard Air Station Clearwater in Florida began a dedicated search for the ship.  and an MH-60T Jayhawk helicopter from CGAS Clearwater joined search efforts later that day. MH-65C Dolphin helicopters from Coast Guard Air Station Miami in Florida and Coast Guard Air Station Borinquen in Puerto Rico, along with HC-144A Ocean Sentry fixed-wing patrol aircraft from Miami, were also present.

Despite the hazardous conditions, a helicopter crew recovered a life ring from El Faro. Conditions markedly improved on October 4 as Joaquin moved northeast, away from the Bahamas; winds averaged  and visibility was unlimited. Taking advantage of the clear weather, the helicopter remained in flight for eleven hours, requiring refueling twice.

Northland and Resolute continued operations overnight with engineers using night vision goggles to take part in the search. The United States Navy provided P-8A Poseidon fixed wing aircraft from Naval Air Station Jacksonville to assist on October 5; three Crowley Maritime tugboats also joined. Search operations were conducted at a near-continuous pace by this date.

On October 5, an unidentified body in a survival suit, presumed to be from El Faro, was found but was not recovered. According to the rescue diver, the body was unrecognizable, its head three times normal size, and was left to be retrieved later in the day. However, a failure in the positioning device ultimately resulted in losing the body. Several other unopened survival suits were recovered.

A deflated life raft and an unoccupied, heavily damaged lifeboat—one of two aboard El Faro, each capable of carrying 43 people and stocked with food and water for a few days—were also found on October 5.

The U.S. Air Force and Air National Guard provided three additional HC-130P/J aircraft on October 6. At sunset on October 7, the Coast Guard announced the cessation of search operations.

Aftermath
On October 7, a Navy salvage team was requested to search for the wreckage at the behest of the NTSB. Senator Bill Nelson of Florida wrote a letter to the agency urging them to look into TOTE's policies regarding severe weather. Nelson also cited that El Faros lifeboats were "outdated and inadequate for the conditions the crew faced". TOTE established a fund for families of the crew on October 9 through the Seamen's Church Institute of New York and New Jersey.

On October 14, a $100 million lawsuit was filed against TOTE by a family member of one of the missing crew, citing negligence on the company's behalf in letting a non-seaworthy vessel sail into a hurricane. On October 28, another lawsuit was filed on behalf of the estate of a man who died in the sinking. The complaint stated that "without power, the M/V EL FARO was merely a cork in the sea as the Hurricane neared". By April 19, 2016, TOTE Maritime had settled with 18 of the 33 families for more than $7 million.

 was chosen to replace El Faros former operations.

Search for the wreckage

On October 19,  departed from Joint Expeditionary Base Little Creek–Fort Story in Virginia Beach, Virginia, to conduct an underwater search for El Faro. The vessel was equipped with a towed pinger locator, side-scan sonar, and a remotely operated vehicle.

The NTSB reported that the object was "consistent with a [] cargo ship ... in an upright position and in one piece". On November 16, the agency announced it had completed its search of the sunken ship but did not find the VDR. On January 3, 2016, the NTSB opened the public accident docket on the investigation into the sinking, initially releasing underwater images and video of the vessel.

Second and third search effort for VDR
The agency was unable to retrieve the recorder at that time because it was too close to the ship's mast and other obstructions.

On August 5, 2016, USNS Apache returned to the site and, five days later, recovered the VDR. Ten months after the sinking, the VDR was delivered to the NTSB in Mayport, Florida to continue the investigation.

Findings of investigation reports

U.S. Coast Guard
The Coast Guard's El Faro Marine Board of Investigation completed its final report on September 24, 2017, and published it on October 1 in its document library. The 199-page Marine Board's Report detailed facts, analysis, and conclusions and made safety, administrative and enforcement recommendations.

Coast Guard investigators placed nearly all of the blame on Captain Davidson of El Faro, who had underestimated both the strength of the storm and the ship's vulnerability in rough weather, and did not take enough measures to evade the storm even though his crew raised concerns about its increasing strength and changing direction. Investigators stated that if Davidson had survived the storm, his actions would have been grounds for the Coast Guard to revoke his captain's license. Davidson "was ultimately responsible for the vessel, the crew and its safe navigation", said Capt. Jason Neubauer, who chaired the investigation.

Coast Guard investigators also noted that TOTE Maritime, El Faros owner, made several violations regarding crew members' rest periods and work hours, had no dedicated safety officer to oversee the ship, and used outdated, "open air" lifeboats (similar to the types used on older vessels, such as Titanic) instead of the modern-day enclosed survival crafts, among other violations.

NTSB

The NTSB met in Washington, D.C., on December 12, 2017, to discuss contributing factors to the sinking as well as to "vote on recommendations to address safety issues uncovered during the investigation". The board meeting was webcast live. The board's 400-page report:

 criticized Captain Davidson's decision to advance into the oncoming storm, despite numerous calls from the crew to alter course, and noted he had relied on outdated weather information from a commercial service, Bon Voyage System
 criticized the Coast Guard's practices of grandfathering in vessels, exempting them from using closed lifeboats; the obsolete lifeboats were not properly maintained, were not launched, and in all probability would not have offered useful shelter
 noted TOTE's failure to maintain a superannuated and deteriorating vessel

In their final report, the NTSB determined

Memorials
Twin memorials remembering El Faro'''s crew were erected in Jacksonville and in San Juan.

There is another memorial located in Rockland, Maine by artist Jay Sawyer. There were 5 people from the Rockland-area who died on the El Faro.

See also

List of Bermuda Triangle incidents
List of disasters in the United States by death toll
List of maritime disasters in the 21st century
List of roll-on/roll-off vessel accidents
List of shipwrecks in 2015
List of shipwrecks of North America

References

Further reading
 Frump, Robert. "The Captains of Thor – What Really Caused the Loss of the SS El Faro" ({Race Point} September 27, 2018)
 Foy, George Michelsen. Run the Storm: A Savage Hurricane, a Brave Crew, and the Wreck of the SS El Faro (Charles Scribner's Sons, 2018) 
 Korten, Tristram. Into the Storm: Two Ships, a Deadly Hurricane, and an Epic Battle for Survival (Ballantine Books, 2018) 
 Slade, Rachel. Into the Raging Sea: Thirty-Three Mariners, One Megastorm, and the Sinking of El Faro'' (Ecco Press, 2018) 

2015 Atlantic hurricane season
1974 ships
Cargo ships of the United States
Maritime incidents in 2015
Shipwrecks of the United States
Ships built by the Sun Shipbuilding & Drydock Company
Ships lost with all hands
2015 disasters in the United States